José María Esteban (born 27 May 1954) is a Spanish sprint canoer who competed in the mid to late 1970s. Competing in two Summer Olympics, he won a silver medal in the K-4 1000 m event at Montreal in 1976.

Esteban also won four medals at the ICF Canoe Sprint World Championships with a gold (K-4 1000 m: 1975), a silver (K-4 500 m: 1978), and two bronzes (K-4 1000 m: 1977, 1978).

References

1954 births
Canoeists at the 1972 Summer Olympics
Canoeists at the 1976 Summer Olympics
Living people
Olympic canoeists of Spain
Olympic silver medalists for Spain
Spanish male canoeists
Olympic medalists in canoeing
ICF Canoe Sprint World Championships medalists in kayak
Medalists at the 1976 Summer Olympics
20th-century Spanish people